"Louie" is the first single from Blood Raw's debut album My Life: The True Testimony, and features labelmate Young Jeezy. The song peaked at number 69 on the Billboard Hot R&B/Hip-Hop Songs chart. In the single, he talks about the French brand, Louis Vuitton.

Charts

References

2008 songs
2008 debut singles
Jeezy songs
Def Jam Recordings singles
Songs written by Jeezy